"Freedom" is a song recorded by American singer Beyoncé featuring American rapper Kendrick Lamar for her sixth studio album, Lemonade (2016). The song was written by Jonny Coffer, Beyoncé, Carla Marie Williams, Dean McIntosh and Kendrick Lamar; it contains samples of "Let Me Try", written by Frank Tirado, performed by Kaleidoscope; samples of "Collection Speech/Unidentified Lining Hymn", recorded by Alan Lomax in 1959, performed by Reverend R.C. Crenshaw; and samples of "Stewball", recorded by Alan Lomax and John Lomax, Sr. in 1947, performed by Prisoner "22" at Mississippi State Penitentiary at Parchman. Its production was handled by Beyoncé, Coffer and veteran hip hop record producer Just Blaze.

Upon its release, "Freedom" managed to appear on various music charts. It peaked at number 35 in the US, on the Billboard Hot 100 and 40 in the UK. The song's music video is part of a one-hour film with the same title as its parent album, originally aired on HBO. Beyoncé performed the song live as part of the set list of The Formation World Tour (2016) and at the BET Awards 2016. It received a nomination for Best Rap/Sung Performance at the 2017 Grammy Awards.

Background
The song was written by Jonny Coffer, Beyoncé, Carla Marie Williams, Dean McIntosh (Arrow Benjamin), Kendrick Lamar, Frank Tirado, Alan Lomax and John Lomax, Sr. while its production was handled by Coffer, Beyoncé and hip hop record producer Just Blaze. It contains three musical samples: "Let Me Try", written by Frank Tirado, performed by Kaleidoscope; "Collection Speech/Unidentified Lining Hymn" (1959) and recorded by Alan Lomax, performed by Reverend R.C. Crenshaw; and "Stewball" (1947), recorded by Alan Lomax and John Lomax, Sr., performed by Prisoner "22" at Mississippi State Penitentiary at Parchman. "Freedom" was mixed and recorded by Stuart White at Pacifique Recording Studios and The Beehive respectively. Its audio engineering was finished by Ramon Rivas with the assistance of John Cranfield. Arrow Benjamin, who collaborated with Beyoncé on "Runnin' (Lose It All)" by musician Naughty Boy in 2015, served as the backing vocalist. Boots and Myles William were responsible for the programming while Dave Kutch mastered the song at The Mastering Palace NYC in North Hollywood, California. Marcus Miller and Canei Finch played the bass and additional piano in "Freedom". On February 7, 2016, right after the Super Bowl halftime show in which Beyoncé performed Formation, a commercial announcing The Formation World Tour aired with a then-unknown instrumental, which turned out to be the Freedom instrumental.

Critical reception
"Freedom" was met with critical acclaim. Pitchfork named the song "Best New Track", with the editor Britt Jullious commenting "After songs of paranoia, anger, and revenge, we finally get a song that speaks truth to Beyoncé’s deep well of feelings. Bathed in psychedelic, synthetic organs and a propulsive drum beat, the track cuts straight, providing an alternative narrative of personal redemption. It is also the explanatory work on Lemonade." Everett True for The Independent writes that "Freedom" "roars like thunder, and threatens to topple governments in its wake". Brittany Spanos and Sarah Grant of Rolling Stone called the song "one of the most striking political statements of [Beyoncé's] career".

Later in the year, Consequence of Sound named the song the best one of 2016. "Freedom" was voted in Village Voice'''s Pazz & Jop the 36th best single of 2016.

 Chart performance 
After the release of Lemonade, "Freedom" debuted on the US Billboard Hot 100 chart at number 35 along with every other track from the album on May 2, 2016. It also entered on the Hot R&B/Hip-Hop songs chart at number 21. In Canada, the song debuted and peaked at a position of 60 on the Canadian Hot 100. On the UK Singles Chart, "Freedom" debuted at the position of 40 for the chart issue dated May 5, 2016. The following week it descended five position before falling off the chart afterwards. It set a peak position of 15 on the UK R&B Singles on May 12, 2016. In Australia, "Freedom" peaked at 62 and six on the Australian ARIA Singles Chart and Australian Urban Chart respectively. In France, "Freedom" debuted at its peak position of 53 on April 30, 2016, spending a total of three weeks on the singles chart. It ranked higher in Spain, where it climbed at number 37 on the country's chart. On the Belgian Ultratop Singles Chart in the Flanders region, "Freedom" attained a peak position of 27 in its second week of charting on May 14, 2016. It spent a total of eight weeks on that chart.

 Impact 
The song became an anthem for the 2020 George Floyd protests and saw a subsequent 625% rise in streams, with the track being sung at protests including by actress and singer Amber Riley.

 Live performances 

"Freedom" is part of the set list of The Formation World Tour with the first performance taking place in Miami at the Marlins Park on April 27, 2016. The song was performed during the concert's last act, in a large pool of water on the tour's secondary B-stage. Beyoncé and her dancers perform a choreographed dance, splashing in the water.

Beyoncé performed "Freedom" with Kendrick Lamar as the opening number at the 2016 BET Awards on June 26. It opened with a voice-over of Martin Luther King Jr.'s 1963 "I Have a Dream" speech as female dancers marched towards the main stage. For the performance, Beyoncé was backed by dancers wearing tribal patterns, and performed a stomping choreography in a pool of water, similar to the one performed during The Formation Tour. The stage was illuminated by red and yellow lights and filled with pyrotechnics and smoke throughout the performance. Lamar joined her towards the second half of the song, appearing from below the floor, performing his lines. Towards the end, he joined Beyoncé in the pool, where they both stomped in the water. Billboard praised their performance for its dynamic and intense choreography and its political themes.Time writer Nash Jankins opined that the "intense, thoroughly choreographed" performance of the song with the King snippet, was a further proof of Beyoncé becoming more politically involved with her music. Similarly, August Brown of Los Angeles Times deemed the rendition "powerful, politically and aesthetically charged," and felt that it was evocative of concepts found on Lemonade with its "Hurricane Katrina floods, imagery of the African diaspora, and the relationships between personal and national traumas". Brown went on saying that the politically charged performance came in during a right time, when the matters of black pride, xenophobia and racial justice were highly discussed and finished his review by concluding that watching Beyoncé and Lamar perform was "a consummation of everything good and right in pop music today". The Daily Beasts Marlow Stern called it the show's "shock opener" with its themes of slavery and the Black Lives Matter movement, and noted how seeing the duo perform together was "truly a sight to behold". Matthew Dessem, writing for Slate magazine, noted how the "spectacular" performance was suitable for being an Olympic opening ceremony. He praised both singers for being in their top forms, with Beyoncé particularly being "note-perfect" and summarized the performance as "the rare case of a performer as hyped as Beyoncé actually exceeding sky-high expectations".

Beyoncé performed this song during her 2018 Coachella performance, she then transitioned into “Lift Every Voice and Sing” (commonly known as the Black National Anthem). The performance was subsequently included in the 2019 Homecoming film and live album.

Beyoncé performed “Freedom” during the On the Run II Tour (2018), her second co-headlining, all stadium tour with her husband Jay-Z.

The song was also included on the set list for her and Jay-Z’s performance at the 2018 Global Citizen Festival: Mandela 100 charity concert in Johannesburg, South Africa, which commemorated Nelson Mandela's 100th birthday.

Credits and personnel
Credits adapted from Lemonade'' liner notes.

Writing – Beyoncé Knowles, Jonny Coffer, Carla Marie Williams, Dean McIntosh, Lamar, Frank Tirado, Alan Lomax, John Lomax, Sr.
Production – Coffer, Beyoncé, Just Blaze
Vocal production – Beyoncé 
Audio mixing – Stuart White; Pacifique Recording Studios, North Hollywood, California
Recording – Stuart White, Arthur Chambazyan (assistant); The Beehive, Los Angeles, California
Second engineering – Ramon Rivas
Assistant mix engineering – John Cranfield
Backing vocals – Arrow Benjamin
Additional programming – Boots, Myles William
Bass – Marcus Miller
Additional piano – Canei Finch
Mastering – Dave Kutch; The Mastering Palace NYC, Pacifique Recording Studios, North Hollywood, California

Charts

Weekly charts

Year-end charts

Certifications

Release history

References

External links
 

2016 songs
2016 singles
Beyoncé songs
Columbia Records singles
Kendrick Lamar songs
Songs against racism and xenophobia
Black Lives Matter art
Song recordings produced by Beyoncé
Songs written by Beyoncé
Songs written by Kendrick Lamar
Songs written by Carla Marie Williams
Songs written by Jonny Coffer
Songs about freedom